Kyle Patrick Finn (born 7 December 1998) is an Irish footballer who plays for  side Tamworth, where he plays as a midfielder.

Playing career

Coventry City
Finn made his professional debut in a 3–1 EFL Cup loss to Blackburn Rovers on 8 August 2017. Kyle signed a contract extension with the club on 15 March 2018, the new deal would take him to June 2019, with the club holding an option of a further year to take him to June 2020.

Tamworth (loan)
In August 2018, he moved to Tamworth on a one-month loan deal. A month later, the initial loan was extended by a further four months.

Hereford (loan)
It was confirmed on 30 October 2018, that Finn made his second loan of the campaign, on this occasion he joined National League North side Hereford on an initial one-month long loan deal after he was recalled from his loan at Tamworth. The loan was extended again for a further month on 6 December.

Hereford
On 7 January 2019, his move to Hereford was made permanent, with Coventry City retaining a sell-on fee.

Stourbridge (loan)
He was loaned to Southern League Premier Division Central side Stourbridge on 8 August 2019.

Kyle made his debut for Stourbridge on 10 August 2019 in a Southern League Premier Division Central fixture away at Hitchin Town, Finn scored what proved to be the winning goal in a 2–1 victory.

Rushall Olympic (loan)
On 11 October 2019, Finn made the loan switch to fellow Southern League Premier Division Central side Rushall Olympic.

Halesowen Town
Finn joined Northern Premier League Division One Midlands side Halesowen Town on 8 June 2021, he stated that he decided to drop down two divisions due to increased work commitments.

Kyle made his debut for Halesowen Town on 14 August 2021 in a Northern Premier League Division One Midlands fixture away at Cambridge City, and proved to be the matchwinner scoring the winning goal in a 2–1 victory.

Tamworth

On 1 June 2022, Finn re-signed for Southern League Premier Division Central side Tamworth.

Finn made his second debut for Tamworth on 6 August 2022, in a Southern League Premier Division Central fixture at home to Ilkeston Town, with the match finishing 1-1.

On 20 August 2022, Finn scored his first goal of the 2022–23 season in an away fixture against Bedford Town, with the player netting on the 54th minute to give Tamworth a 5–0 lead, with the match finishing 8–1 to Tamworth.

International career
Finn was called up to represent Republic of Ireland U18 in friendly matches against Czech Republic U18, and played in a match on 30 November 2015, starting the game, and being replaced by Trevor Clarke on the 55th minute, with Czech Republic winning the match 3–1.

Career statistics

References

External links

1998 births
Living people
English footballers
Association football midfielders
Coventry City F.C. players
Tamworth F.C. players
Hereford F.C. players
Stourbridge F.C. players
Rushall Olympic F.C. players
Halesowen Town F.C. players
National League (English football) players
Southern Football League players
Northern Premier League players